Ribblehead is a railway station on the Settle and Carlisle Line, which runs between  and  via . It is owned by Network Rail and managed by Northern Trains.

History
The station was designed by Midland Railway architect, John Holloway Sanders. It opened on 4 December 1876 as Batty Green, but was later renamed Ribblehead on 1 May 1877. It was closed, along with the other smaller stations on the line, on 4 May 1970.

It was reopened on 16 July 1986 by British Rail with only one platform (southbound) in place. The northbound platform had been demolished after the station's closure in May 1970, in order to allow the construction of transfer sidings for a nearby quarry. The sidings still exist and have recently been restored to use for timber trains. A replacement second platform was opened on 28 May 1993, a short distance south of the original site.

In previous years, Ribblehead served as a meteorological station, with the stationmaster transmitting coded reports to the Air Ministry. In 1957, the task was carried out by a former Royal Air Force navigator. Monthly religious services were held in the station's waiting room by the Vicar of Ingleton. These were accompanied by a harmonium concealed behind a billboard in the waiting room, which was brought to the station by a missionary who came as a minister to the construction gangs when the railway was being constructed through the moors in the early 1870s. British Rail charged 2 shillings for the use of the waiting room, which saw as many as 50 worshippers at harvest festivals.

This station is now leased by the Settle and Carlisle Railway Trust, who have completely restored and refurbished it (reopened to public use in 2000). There are resident caretakers, holiday accommodation, a small shop selling memorabilia, and its visitor centre includes exhibits about the history of the line and the fight to keep it open. The visitor centre displays the original station sign and a small exhibition about the Midland Railway company, builders of the line and originally the train operators.

Stationmasters

John James Shrives 1876 - 1880 (afterwards station master at Isham)
Richard Heyward 1880 - 1882 
D. Braden 1882 - 1886
S. Oughton 1886 - 1891 (formerly station master at Worthington, afterwards station master at Edwalton)
George Tingle 1891 - 1893
William Brown 1893 - 1903 (afterwards station master at Newbiggin)
Henry Dilley 1903 - 1913
F.G. Collier from 1913 
Thomas William Whetten until 1930 (afterwards station master at Kirkby Lonsdale)
William John Thomas 1931 - 1932 (afterwards station master at Holmes Chapel)
J.W. Tate
Joe Sheppard ca. 1951
Martin Elliott ca. 1953 ca. 1956
William Sharpe

Facilities
The platforms both have level access, but the northbound one is linked to the rest of the station by a barrow crossing and is not recommended for use for disabled passengers without assistance.  Train running information is available via telephone and information posters.  The station is unstaffed and no ticket machine is provided, so passengers must purchase them on the train or before their journey. Train operator Northern is intending to install both a ticket machine and digital information screens in the near future as part of a rolling station upgrade programme across its network,

Passenger services

Generally there is a train every two hours northbound to Carlisle (eight departures on Mondays to Saturdays) and southbound to Leeds (seven Mon-Fri, plus one extra on Saturdays). One service each day (the last train of the day from Leeds) terminates and starts back from here: the train runs empty across the viaduct to reverse at Blea Moor signal box, where the driver changes ends before returning south. The track layout on the line does not allow the service to terminate further north at Garsdale, which has better connections for nearby settlements.

Five trains each way call on Sundays all year round, with an additional DalesRail service each way also serving the station in the summer. Services through to Carlisle resumed on 31 March 2017 upon reopening of the affected section to traffic.

Onward public transport links
A very occasional bus service is operated on summer Sundays and bank holidays, between Hawes and Settle via Ribblehead (in 2019, one journey each way). At other times there are no onward services available from this station. Passengers for Hawes and Wensleydale generally alight at nearby Garsdale railway station, and use the regular bus service operated by Upper Wensleydale Community Partnership, branded as the 'little white bus'. The last train of the day from Leeds terminates at Ribblehead, but the station has no onward links for passengers leaving that service.

Freight services
Colas Rail Freight began hauling timber from the transfer sidings adjacent to the station in August 2010. The timber arrives by lorry from the local fells and is transported to a woodchip and board plant at Chirk in North Wales.

Roadstone from Ingleton Quarry has also occasionally been railed out of the sidings. All services leaving must head north over Ribblehead Viaduct due to the lack of run-round facilities at the station. Southbound trains can then reverse at Blea Moor Loop.

Gallery

Notes

References

External links 
 
 

Ribblesdale
Railway stations in North Yorkshire
DfT Category F2 stations
Former Midland Railway stations
Railway stations in Great Britain opened in 1876
Railway stations in Great Britain closed in 1970
Railway stations in Great Britain opened in 1986
Reopened railway stations in Great Britain
Northern franchise railway stations
John Holloway Sanders railway stations
Beeching closures in England